Liolaemus buergeri, also known commonly as Buerger's tree iguana, is a species of lizard in the family  Liolaemidae. The species is native to Argentina and Chile.

Etymology
The specific name, buergeri, is in honor of German explorer Otto Bürger (born 1865), who collected natural history specimens in South America.

Geographic range
In Argentina L. buergeri is found in Mendoza Province and Neuquén Province. In Chile it is found in Curicó Province and Talca Province.

Habitat

Diet
L. buergeri is omnivorous.

Reproduction
L. buergeri is viviparous.

References

Further reading
Medina CD, Avila LJ, Morando M (2013). "Hacia una Taxonomía Integral: poniendo a prueba especies candidatas relacionadas a Liolaemus buergeri Werner 1907 (Iguania: Liolaemini) mediante análisis morfológicos ". Cuadernos de Herpetología 27 (1): 27–34. (in Spanish, with an abstract in English).
Müller L, Hellmich W (1935). "Beiträge zur Kenntnis der Herpetofauna Chiles. IX. Über Liolaemus buergeri Werner ". Zoologische Anzeiger 109 (5/6): 121–128. (in German).
Werner F (1907). "Sobre algunos lagartos nuevos clasificados i descritos ". In: Bürger O (1907). "Estudios sobre reptiles chilenos ". Anales de la Universidad de Chile 121: 149–155. (Liolaemus buergeri, new species, p. 152). (in Spanish).

buergeri
Reptiles described in 1907
Reptiles of Chile
Taxa named by Franz Werner